Ngok Loden Sherab or Ngok Lotsawa Loden Sherab (1059–1109) - Important in the transmission of Buddhism from India to Tibet. One of the most renowned translators in Tibetan history and traditionally known as one of the "Ten Pillars of Tibetan Buddhism" (ka chen bcu). Also known as Matiprajna (Sanskrit).

Translations

Tibetan Tanjur
Two versions of the Ratnagotravibhāga were translated by Loden Sherab at Srinagar in Kashmir under the supervision of Kashmiri Pandits Ratnavajra and Sajjana towards the close of the 11th century CE:
 Theg-pa-chen-po rgyud-bla maḥi bstan-bcos (Mahāyāna-uttaratantra-śāstra), Tohaku Catalogue No. 4024
 Theg-pa-chen-po rgyud-bla-maḥi bstan-bcos rnam-par-bsad-pa (Mahāyāna-uttaratantra-śāstra-vyākhyā), Tohaku Catalogue No. 4025.

References

Further reading

External links
 blo ldan shes rab - TBRC P2551
 Ngok Loden Sherab
 Ngok Lotsawa Loden Sherab

1059 births
1109 deaths
Kadampa lamas
Tibetan Buddhists from Tibet
Tibetan Buddhism writers
11th-century Tibetan people
12th-century Tibetan people
11th-century Buddhists
12th-century Buddhists